The 1994 African Cup of Champions Clubs Final was a football tie held over two legs in December 1994 between Zamalek SC, and Espérance de Tunis.

Espérance de Tunis from Tunisia won that final 3 – 1 on aggregate.

Match details

First leg

Second leg

Notes and references
 http://www.angelfire.com/ak/EgyptianSports/ZamalekGmAfr.html#1994%20Home%20Final

References

African Cup of Champions Clubs Finals
1
CCL
CCL